Wonka can refer to the following:

 Salif (rapper) (born Salif Wonka in 1982), French rapper based in Boulogne-Billancourt
 Wonka VM, an open-source, portable, embedded implementation of the Java virtual machine specification
 Pavel Wonka (1953–1988), Czechoslovak liberal political activist, dissident, human rights activist, and anti-communist
 Willy Wonka, a fictional character who appears in Roald Dahl's 1964 children's novel Charlie and the Chocolate Factory and its film adaptations
Wonka Bar, a fictional chocolate bar produced by the character
Wonka (film), an upcoming musical fantasy film directed by Paul King exploring the origins of the character
The Willy Wonka Candy Company, or simply "Wonka," the former name of Nestlé Candy Shop, whose trademarks are now owned by Ferrara Candy Company, a defictionalized version of the Wonka brand

See also
 Wanka (disambiguation)
 Willy Wonka (disambiguation)
 World Organization of Family Doctors (WONCA), a global not-for-profit professional organization